Fortis FC Reserves and Academy are the reserve team and youth system of the Dhaka based Bangladesh Premier League club Fortis FC. A combination of the youth and reserve team players compete in the country's second division called the Bangladesh Championship League, under the name Fortis Football Academy.

Academy
Since its inception in 2020, Fortis FC built an academy which accommodates prospects in three age categories- Under-16, 18, and 20. The academy is located at Fortis Ground in Badda, Dhaka.

On July 29 2022, Fortis FC posted on social media that they will select three categories (U-16, 18 & 20) of footballers for their academy through open trials. The post with the headlines "Want to be a footballer?" got massive responses from all over the country. The first trials in Dhaka, were held for three days straight starting from 5 August 2022. About 6,000 players from all over the country participated at the trials, from which 250 people were initially selected, a number which was further reduced by the selection committee consisting of former Bangladesh national football team players Mamunul Islam and Atiqur Rahman Meshu. It was also reported that numerous players who travelled to the capital in order to partake in the trial spent the night at railway stations. The trial's at the M. A. Aziz Stadium in Chittagong later on that month, saw another 160 players from 4,000 participants being selected. After witnessing the success of the countrywide trial, the club president Shahin Hassan expressed his desire to have their Academy and Reserve players take part in the second tier, the Bangladesh Championship League.

Facilities
The Fortis Ground in Badda, Dhaka  and the BKSP football ground are the two main training centers/pitches used by the Academy and reserves team. The Fortis Ground currently boasts a resort, consisting of a gym and a swimming pool, open to both senior and junior players.

Under-16
In November 2022, Fortis U-16 team took part in the inaugural season of the BFF U-16 Football Tournament. However, they were knocked out of the Semi-final by Wari Club U-16.

Under-20
On 30 November 2022, it was confirmed that the Fortis Football Academy will take part in the 2022–23 Bangladesh Championship League, making Fortis FC only the second top-tier club after Saif Sporting Club (Youth Team) to have their Academy and Reserve team play in a professional football league.

Current squad

Competitive record

Head coach records

Club management

Current technical staff

References

Football clubs in Bangladesh
Sport in Bangladesh
Football academies in Asia
Youth football in Bangladesh
2020 establishments in Bangladesh